Sunday Seah (born January 7, 1978) is a retired Liberian professional footballer who last played as a goalkeeper for UMC Roots FC.

Club career
Born in Monrovia, Seah began playing club football with local side Junior Professional at age 13. He has played as a goalkeeper and a striker in India for FC Kochin. From 1999 to 2001, he appeared in the National Football League (India) with the Elephants, where he scored 8 goals in 19 league matches. With Kochin, he won the National Football League in 1999.

In 2001, he moved to another Indian club Salgaocar SC, where he played until 2003 and appeared in 41 league matches, scoring 20 goals. He was in Salgaocar's 2002–03 National Football League Runners-up squad.

Seah signed with Indian giants Dempo SC in 2003 and appeared in only a season before moving to Indonesian outfit Persmin Minahasa in 2004. With Dempo, he lifted the Federation Cup trophy in 2004. During his days in India, he was one of the best in business when it came to scoring goals.

He has also played for clubs like PSIM Yogyakarta of Liga 2 (Indonesia), Persiwa Wamena of Liga 3 (Indonesia) and then he finally moved to his home country and joined LISCR FC in 2009.

International career
Seah made his senior international debut for Liberia national football team in a 1998 FIFA World Cup qualification match against Namibia on 8 June 1997, which ended as their 2-1 defeat.

Between 1997 and 2011, he represented Liberia in both the World Cup and African Cup of Nations qualifiers, appearing in a total of 14 matches.

Honors
FC Kochin
Kerala State Football League: 1999
Salgaocar
National Football League runner-up: 2002–03
Dempo SC
Federation Cup: 2004

See also
Liberian international footballers

References

External links
Sunday Seah (Liberia) at worldfootball.net

1978 births
Living people
Liberian footballers
Liberian expatriate sportspeople in India
Expatriate footballers in India
Association football goalkeepers
Expatriate footballers in Indonesia
Dempo SC players
Expatriate footballers in Myanmar
Salgaocar FC players
Sportspeople from Monrovia
Junior Professional FC players
Liberia international footballers
National Football League (India) players